The 56th Rescue Squadron is part of the 31st Fighter Wing, Aviano Air Base, Italy.  The squadron was previously assigned to the 48th Fighter Wing at RAF Lakenheath, England. It operates HH-60G Pave Hawk helicopters conducting search and rescue missions.

Mission 

The 56th Rescue Squadron is a combat-ready search and rescue squadron of HH-60G Pave Hawk helicopters capable of executing all-weather search and rescue missions day or night in hostile environments in support of USAFE, USEUCOM, and NATO operations. It employs a state-of-the-art communications and navigation system along with advanced search and rescue equipment. The squadron is capable of deploying to any theater of operations in the world.

History

Morocco 

The 56th flew search and rescue, and medical evacuation, in North Africa and southern Europe from, November 1952-March 1960.

Vietnam War 

It flew combat missions in Southeast Asia from, 10 July 1972 – 15 August 1973, to include search and rescue, airborne mission control, and aerial refueling. The squadron continued to perform local search and rescue until February 1975.
On 1 April 1972 the 39th Aerospace Rescue and Recovery Squadron was inactivated and its aircraft and crews temporarily became part of Detachment 4 of the 3d Aerospace Rescue and Recovery Group at Korat Royal Thai Air Force Base. On 8 July 1972 the detachment was replaced by the 56th Aerospace Rescue and Recovery Squadron.

On 12 April 1975 the squadron's HC-130Ps supported Operation Eagle Pull, the evacuation of Phnom Penh, Cambodia.

On 15 October 1975 the squadron was inactivated at Korat and its 4 remaining HC-130Ps joined the 40th Aerospace Rescue and Recovery Squadron.

Operations from Iceland and the United Kingdom 

It continued the search and rescue support mission for the Iceland Defense Force from, May 1988-September 2006, after being redesigned from Detachment 14, 67th Aerospace Rescue and Recovery Squadron, contributing to 958 saves and assists during the 45 year SAR mission in Iceland.

In June-July 2003, a detachment of HH-60G helicopters and Pararescuemen extracted U.S. Embassy personnel and American Citizens from the U.S. Embassy in Monrovia, Liberia during Operation Shining Express.

Lineage 

 Constituted as the 56th Air Rescue Squadron on 17 October 1952
 Activated on 14 November 1953
 Discontinued and inactivated on 18 March 1960
 Activated on 8 July 1972
 Redesignated 56th Aerospace Rescue and Recovery Squadron on 10 July 1972
 Inactivated on 15 October 1975
 Activated on 1 May 1988
 Redesignated 56th Air Rescue Squadron on 1 June 1989
 Redesignated 56th Rescue Squadron on 1 February 1993.

Assignments 

 7th Air Rescue Group, 14 November 1952 (attached to 5th Air Division until 28 February 1953)
 12th Air Rescue Group, 8 December 1956
 Air Rescue Service, 18 February 1958 - 18 March 1960 (attached European Rescue Operations Center)
 3d Aerospace Rescue and Recovery Group, 8 July 1972
 41st Aerospace Rescue and Recovery Wing (later 41st Rescue and Weather Reconnaissance Wing, 20 Aug 1972-15 Oct 1975 (attached to 3d Aerospace Rescue and Recovery Group)
 39th Special Operations Wing, 1 May 1988
 41st Rescue and Weather Reconnaissance Wing, 1 April 1989
 Air Rescue Service, 1 August 1989
 Air Forces Iceland, 1 February 1993
 35th Operations Group, 31 May 1993
 85th Operations Group, 1 October 1994
 85th Group, 1 July 1995
 48th Operations Group, 28 June 2006 – April 
 31st Operations Group, May 2018 – present

Stations 

 Sidi Slimane Air Base, French Morocco], 14 November 1952 – 18 March 1960
 Korat Royal Thai Air Force Base, Thailand, 8 July 1972 – 15 October 1975
 Naval Air Station Keflavik, Iceland, 1 May 1988 - May 2006
 RAF Lakenheath, England, 1 June 2006 – April 2018 
 Aviano Air Base, Italy, May 2018 – present

Aircraft 

 Sikorsky H-5 Dragonfly (1952–1953)
 Grumman SA-16 Albatross (1952–1960)
 Douglas SC-47 Skytrain (1953–1956)
 Sikorsky SH-19 (1953–1960)
 Lockheed HC-130 Hercules (1972–1975)
 Kaman HH-43 Huskie (1972–1975)
 Sikorsky HH-3 Jolly Green Giant (1988–1992)
 Sikorsky HH-60 Pave Hawk (1992 – present)

References 

 Notes

 Citations

Bibliography

External links 

 
 

056